The Little Indian River is a  river on the Upper Peninsula of the U.S. state of Michigan.

Most of its course roughly parallels that of the Indian River a few miles to the south and west. The only major tributary is Grassy Creek, aside from the outflows of several small lakes.

References

Rivers of Michigan
Rivers of Alger County, Michigan
Rivers of Schoolcraft County, Michigan
Tributaries of Lake Michigan